"Lucky 4 You (Tonight I'm Just Me)" is a song written by Kristyn Osborn, Coley McCabe and Jason Deere, and recorded by American country music group SHeDAISY.  It was released in September 2000 as the fourth single from their album The Whole SHeBANG.

Content
The song, told from her point of view, describes the varying emotional reactions of a woman in the aftermath of a relationship, ended by her partner. Though it is not clear whether serious or made simply in jest, the theme of the song suggests that the woman has dissociative identity disorder. Her reactions range from passive forgiveness to extreme anger as she talks to her former partner at a party where he is accompanied by a new woman.

Chart performance
"Lucky 4 You (Tonight I'm Just Me)" debuted at number 70 on the U.S. Billboard Hot Country Singles & Tracks for the week of September 23, 2000.

Year-end charts

References

2000 singles
1999 songs
SHeDAISY songs
Song recordings produced by Dann Huff
Lyric Street Records singles
Songs written by Jason Deere
Songs written by Kristyn Osborn